The Methodist Church, Great Budworth, is a former Wesleyan Methodist Church in the village of Great Budworth, Cheshire, England.  The church is recorded in the National Heritage List for England as a designated Grade II listed building.  It was built in the middle of the 19th century for Rowland Egerton-Warburton of nearby Arley Hall.  It is constructed in brick, has a slate roof, and consists of a rectangular building with a service wing at right angles.  It is now closed and is used as a private house.

See also

Listed buildings in Great Budworth

References

Former Methodist churches in the United Kingdom
Former churches in Cheshire
Grade II listed churches in Cheshire
19th-century Methodist church buildings
19th-century churches in the United Kingdom
Methodist churches in Cheshire